Elton L. Bomer (born July 30, 1935) is an American politician in the state of Texas. He served in the Texas House of Representatives from 1981 to 1985 and 1991 to 1995 before serving as Secretary of State of Texas under Governor George W. Bush from 1999 to 2000.

References

1935 births
Living people
People from Anderson County, Texas
People from Austin, Texas
Secretaries of State of Texas
Democratic Party members of the Texas House of Representatives
University of Houston alumni
American businesspeople
State insurance commissioners of the United States